Lester J. Dugan (1921 – January 25, 2002) was and American football coach. He was the first head football coach at Buffalo State College in Buffalo, New York, serving from 1981 to 1985.

Born  in Asbury Park, New Jersey, Dugan was raised in Neptune City, New Jersey and attended Asbury Park High School, where he played on state championships teams in football and basketball. He served in the United States Marine Corps during World War II, earning a Bronze Star Medal for heroism during the Battle of Okinawa. Dugan played college football and college basketball at Niagara University in Lewiston, New York.

Dugan died at the age of 85, on January 25, 2020, at Lockport Memorial Hospital in Lockport, New York.

Head coaching record

College football

References

External links
 Buffalo State Hall of Fame – Les Dugan
 

1921 births
2002 deaths
Asbury Park High School alumni
Buffalo State Bengals football coaches
Niagara Purple Eagles football players
Niagara Purple Eagles men's basketball players
High school baseball coaches in the United States
High school basketball coaches in New York (state)
High school football coaches in New York (state)
United States Marines
United States Marine Corps personnel of World War II
People from Asbury Park, New Jersey
People from Neptune City, New Jersey
Coaches of American football from New Jersey
Players of American football from New Jersey
Baseball coaches from New Jersey
Basketball coaches from New Jersey
Basketball players from New Jersey